Chaoshan  or Teoswa (peng'im: Dio5suan1 [ti̯o˥˥꜖꜖.sũ̯ã˧˧]) is a cultural-linguistic region in the east of Guangdong, China. It is the origin of the Min Nan Chaoshan dialect. The region, also known as Chiushan in Cantonese, consists of the cities Chaozhou, Jieyang and Shantou. It differs linguistically from the rest of Guangdong province which was historically dominated by Yue speakers, followed by Hakka and Leizhou Min speakers.  However, Mandarin has recently become the dominant language in the region. It is historically important as the ancestral homeland of many  Viets, Thais, Cambodian, Singaporeans, Malaysians and Indonesians of Chinese descent.

Etymology and definition
The name "Chaoshan" is a contraction of the names of two of its administrative areas, the prefecture-level cities of Chaozhou and Shantou. Chaozhou and Shantou have agglomerated into a single extremely dense metropolitan area, which is among China's most densely populated. It is Guangdong's second largest metropolitan area after the Guangzhou-centered Pearl River Delta, and part of the Southern China Coast Megalopolis.

Economy

The Chaoshan region, despite being the second largest economy in Guangdong after the Pearl River Delta, is still considered quite small in comparison. In recent years, due to corruption and car smuggling in the 1980s and 1990s, the central government has chosen to slow down growth of this region even though it is still designated as an SEZ (Special Economic Zone). As a result, business has slowed compared to other areas in Guangdong. In recent years Li Ka-shing has also invested heavily in the education and healthcare of this region, in response to the potential for growth.

There have been proposals to the Chinese government to amalgamate the whole region into one whole Special Economic Zone, as the split of the region into three cities in 1991 has rapidly slowed down the level of economic growth in the region, with the per capita GDP of Shantou reaching only US$4,250, whereas it was US$8,600 in the whole province. Since the period of 2007–2012, there has only been a 10% growth in GDP, whereas the average economic growth in the whole province has been around 15% in a similar period of time.

Geography
Encompassing the cities of Chaozhou, Jieyang and Shantou, the Chaoshan region, with a permanent population of 13,937,897 at the end of 2010, covers an area of  that stretches from Jieyang on the coast to the southern border of Fujian.

Culture and language
Chaoshan has a culture that is distinct from its neighbours in Guangdong and the rest of China. It does, however, share similarities to the Minnan areas just north of Chaoshan in Fujian province. One of the main reasons is its language, the Chaoshan or Swatow dialect. This variant of Chinese has 8 tones, compared to the 6 tones found in Cantonese and the 4-5 tones found in Mandarin, which made it one of the most difficult ones to master. Music, opera and Chaozhou cuisine are further characteristics that distinguish Chaoshan people from the rest of Guangdong.

The Chaoshan dialect of Min is considered one of the more conservative Chinese dialects, as it preserves features from ancient Chinese that have been lost in some of the other modern dialects of Chinese. Locals claim Chaoshan dialect is one of the oldest in China. It is spoken by about 10 million people in local Chaoshan and approximately 2-5 million overseas.

Chaozhou opera is a traditional art form which has a history of more than 500 years, and it has been performed in over 20 countries and regions. Based on the local folk dances and ballads, Chaozhou opera has formed its own style under the influence of Nanxi opera. Nanxi is one of the oldest Chinese operas that originated in the Song Dynasty. The old form of choral accompaniment still remains its special features. Clowns and females are the most distinctive characters in a Chaozhou opera, and fan-playing and acrobatic skills are more prominent than in other types of performances.

Gongfu tea, the "espresso" of Chinese teas with a formidable kick, which was first consumed back in the Song Dynasty, is still flourishing and remains an important part of social etiquette in Chaozhou.

At the local teahouse, tea service is often accompanied with Chaozhou music. Chaozhou string music, the gong and drum music, flute music are the traditional musical forms of Chaozhou music. Chaozhou string music is made up of mostly plucked and bowed string instruments, and on some occasions, wind instruments are used. The most characteristic instruments are the rihin, tihu and yahu (all two-stringed bowed lutes), the sanxian, pipa, ruan, guzheng, and yangqin. The number of instruments and performers in the ensemble is flexible and depends on the availability of instruments and musicians to play them - but for an even and balanced texture only one of each instrument is preferred. Chaozhou drum music includes the big drum and gong, the small drum and gong, the dizi set drum and dong and su drum and gong ensembles. The current Chaozhou drum music is said to be similar to the form of the Drum and Wind Music of the Han and Tang Dynasties. Chaozhou guzheng is also regarded a major genre of Southern style of Chinese guzheng.

Chaoshan cuisine 

Chaoshan cuisine, also known as Chiuchow cuisine, Chaozhou cuisine or Teochew cuisine, originated from the Chaoshan region in the eastern part of China's Guangdong Province, which includes the cities of Chaozhou, Shantou and Jieyang. Relative economic and linguistic isolation (most people do also speak Mandarin) has helped maintain Chaoshan area's local traditions, which has turned into a boon for foodies.

Chaoshan cuisine, similar to Cantonese cooking, is characterized by use of ingredients such as fresh seafood, poultry, galangal, Chinese basil and vegetables. Chaoshan dishes taste fresh, light and natural. There are also unique local sauces such as puning soy sauce, Shantou sweet and spicy sauce, garlic white vinegar sauce and fermented fish sauce. Salty, spicy, sweet or sour, each has its own outstanding flavor. Teochew (also Chaoshan or Chiu Chow or Chaozhou) cooking focuses on restraint and subtlety and avoids heavy seasonings to highlight the freshness of ingredients. The ingredients of Chaoshan dishes usually include white olives, rice noodles, or mandarin oranges. These ingredients often come from the sea in Chaoshan, a hundred miles up the coast from Hong Kong.

The cooking methods of Chaoshan dishes are diversified, including brining, deep-frying, pan-frying, braising, alive marinating, stewing, roasting, smoking, steam stewing, dressing, etc. The most used method among these is brining. Chaoshan brined meat is the signature dish in Chaoshan cuisine. Meat is brined together with rich flavors. Local dishes also use marinated raw seafood, such as colorful flower crabs steeped in a bath of vinegar, salt, chilis and cilantro. The seafood cooked by this way is extremely umami.

Chaoshan has a rich history of farming and drying seaweed, which Westerners might instinctively associate with Korean and Japanese cooking. The ancient Teochew tradition of preparing thinly sliced raw fish was later exported to Japan, becoming known as sashimi.

The most famous culinary method in Chaoshan is marinated broth stew, where poultry (especially local geese) and other meat are slow cooked in a highly flavored broth. This is different from Cantonese food, in which barbecued meat is arguably one of the most representative dishes.

See also 
 Teochew people
 Thai Chinese
 Chu Hua Yuan, the area's traditional coming-of-age ceremony
 Lingnan culture
 Lingnan

References

 
Regions of China
Chaozhou
Shantou